Norma Stafford (April 12, 1932 - November 4, 2005) was an American poet. Born in Tennessee in 1932, she was the tenth of ten children. Stafford attended nursing school, but subsequently left when it was discovered she was lesbian. Stafford was arrested for various misdemeanors and spent five years in prison. While at the California Institution for Women, she began writing poetry and received education through the Santa Cruz Women's Prison Project. After being released from prison, Stafford  continued to write poetry.

References

External links
Discussion of Women in Prison KPFA (1985)

1932 births
2005 deaths
American women poets
American LGBT poets
LGBT people from Tennessee
Poets from Tennessee
20th-century American poets
20th-century American women writers
21st-century American poets
21st-century American women writers
20th-century LGBT people